Porterville, also known as Eaton, is an unincorporated community in Crawford County, Illinois, United States. The community was platted as East Berlin and first saw growth when Richard Porter opened a blacksmith shop there in 1850. A post office opened under the name Eaton in 1852 and closed at a later date.

References

Unincorporated communities in Crawford County, Illinois
Unincorporated communities in Illinois
Populated places established in 1850